The Greyhound Limited is 1929 part-talkie crime drama and railroad theme film directed by Howard Bretherton and starring Monte Blue. Warner Bros. produced and distributed releasing the film in the Vitaphone process, with a music score and sound effects. The film is a follow up to the 1927 film The Black Diamond Express.

The film survives in the Library of Congress and Wisconsin Center For Film and Theatre Research, Madison Wisconsin. The full synchronized soundtrack (except the 5, 7 and 8 reel) survives on Vitaphone discs.

Cast
Monte Blue as Monte
Edna Murphy as Edna
Grant Withers as Bill
Lucy Beaumont as Mrs. Williams, Bill's mother
Ernie Shields as Limpy
Lew Harvey as The Rat

See also
List of early Warner Bros. sound and talking features

References

External links

lobby poster(Wayback Machine)
 Lobby card

1929 films
Warner Bros. films
Films directed by Howard Bretherton
Rail transport films
American crime drama films
1929 crime drama films
American black-and-white films
1920s American films